Juha Leimu (born January 30, 1983 in Tampere, Finland) is a Finnish former professional ice hockey defenceman.

Playing career

Leimu made his SM-liiga debut in 2009–10 when he was offered an eight-game trial period with Tappara having spent the start of the season in Lempäälän Kisa. After the tryout his contract was extended for the rest of the season.
 Leimu recorded 24 points in 36 games and was awarded a three-year extension in May 2010. In 2010–11 Leimu had his career season with 12 goals and 31 points in 50 games.

After his contract with Tappara expired, Pelicans signed Leimu to a two-year contract on April 26, 2013. During his opening season in Lahti Leimu led all Pelicans defencemen in goals scored with 10. In the 2013–14 playoffs Leimu scored the overtime goal in Game 2 that eliminated HIFK in the opening round.

Prior the 2014–15 season Leimu was named the team captain. Leimu was sidelined on multiple occasions during the season due to injuries and recorded 16 points in 40 games. On November 20, 2014 he signed a two-year contract extension with Pelicans.

Leimu holds the Liiga record for the fastest hat-trick after scoring three power-play  goals in just 44 seconds in a 5–6 overtime loss against JYP Jyväskylä on December 15, 2015. Leimu's 16 goals in 2015–16 season were a league high for defensemen.

Career statistics

References

External links 

1983 births
Living people
Finnish ice hockey defencemen
Ilves players
KOOVEE players
Lahti Pelicans players
Lempäälän Kisa players
Ice hockey people from Tampere
Tappara players